California Jam II (also known as Cal Jam II) was a music festival held in Ontario, California, at the Ontario Motor Speedway on March 18, 1978, and produced by Leonard Stogel, Sandy Feldman, and Don Branker. More than 350,000 people attended. The event was promoted by Wolf & Rissmiller Concerts. The festival was a sequel to the original California Jam held in 1974.

Performers

Musical acts featured at the festival included:
Aerosmith
Foreigner
Heart
Mahogany Rush
Dave Mason
Jean-Michel Jarre
Rubicon
Santana
Bob Welch
Ted Nugent

Broadcast, telecast, and record releases
A television special featuring highlights of the festival was broadcast a few months later on the American Broadcasting Company network. CBS Records concurrently released a two-LP soundtrack album of selections from the concert, the track listing of which appears below. Selections from Bob Welch and Foreigner were not included in the soundtrack, as only artists who were contracted to one of CBS's labels were represented.

Track listing

See also

List of historic rock festivals
List of jam band music festivals
Leonard Stogel IMDB

References

External links 
The Official califorinajamfanclub.

Rock festivals in the United States
1978 in California
1978 music festivals
Jam band festivals
Music festivals established in 1978
Ontario, California